Gardinerpiscis is an extinct genus of prehistoric actinopterygian fish that lived during the Kungurian age of the early Permian epoch in what is now Kazakhstan. It was originally named "Gardineria" by Kazantseva-Selezneva (1981). Because this genus name was already given to an extant scleractinian coral (Gardineria Vaughan, 1907), the new name Gardinerpiscis was erected for the Permian fish. The genus includes a single species (monotypy): Gardinerpiscis akkolkensis.

Gardinerpiscis is named after British palaeontologist and zoologist Brian G. Gardiner (1932 - 2021).

See also

 Prehistoric fish
 List of prehistoric bony fish

References

Palaeonisciformes
Permian fish